Wila Willk'i (Aymara wila blood, blood-red, willk'i gap, "red gap", also spelled Wila Willkhi) is a mountain in the Bolivian Andes which reaches a height of approximately . It is located in the La Paz Department, Loayza Province, Cairoma Municipality. This is where the Wila Willk'i Jawira (Aymara jawira "river") originates. It flows to the northwest as an affluent of the Luribay River.

References 

Mountains of La Paz Department (Bolivia)